Hotel Silverine Lake Resort is a 4-stars hotel near the Lake Balaton, in the spa town Balatonfüred, the former Roman settlement.

Because of its location near the town port, it is a favourite place for the fans of yachting.

References

External links 
Homepage
Location on Google Maps.

Hotels in Balatonfüred
Hotels in Hungary
Lake Balaton
Hotels established in 2006
Hotel buildings completed in 2006